This is a list of ambassadors to Montenegro. Note that some ambassadors are responsible for more than one country while others are directly accredited to Podgorica.

Current Residential Ambassadors to Montenegro

Current Non-residential Ambassadors to Montenegro

See also
 Foreign relations of Montenegro
 List of diplomatic missions of Montenegro
 List of diplomatic missions in Montenegro

References
 Order of Precedence of Heads of Mission
Honorary Consul of Georgia in Montenegro

 
Montenegro